"Falling" is a song written and performed by Australian singer-songwriter Candice Alley. It was released as the lead single from her debut studio album, Colorblind (2003), on 26 May 2003. The song peaked at number five on the Australian ARIA Singles Chart in July and was certified gold.

Track listings
Australian CD single (0199682)
 "Falling" 
 "You Will Stay"	
 "Leaning On My Shoulder"

US remix single
 "Falling" (Fred Falke Vocal Mix)		
 "Falling" (Fred Falke Vocal Dub)	
 "Falling" (Fred Radio Edit)

Charts

Weekly charts

Year-end charts

Certification

References

2003 debut singles
2003 songs
Candice Alley songs
Song recordings produced by Peter-John Vettese
Universal Music Australia singles